Iino is a Japanese surname. Notable people with the surname include:

, Japanese shogi player
, Japanese voice actress
, Japanese footballer

Fictional characters
, a character in the manga series Kaguya-sama: Love Is War

Japanese-language surnames